Stuart Walker may refer to:

 Stuart H. Walker (1923–2018), American sailboat racer, professor of pediatrics and writer of sports books
 Stuart Walker (filmmaker) (1888–1941), American film producer and director
 Stuart Walker (footballer) (born 1951), English former goalkeeper 
 Stuart Walker (cricketer) (born 1976), Zimbabwean cricketer
 Stuart Walker (designer), film and TV designer and Royal Designer for Industry
 Stuart Walker, Canadian singer from The Reklaws, songwriter

See also
 Stewart Walker (disambiguation)